Utricularia reniformis is a large perennial carnivorous plant that belongs to the genus Utricularia. U. reniformis is endemic to Brazil. It was originally published and described by Augustin Saint-Hilaire in 1830. It usually grows as a terrestrial plant in wet grasslands and only sometimes as an epiphyte in the water-filled leaf axils of some bromeliad species. It has been collected in flower between October and March.

See also 
 List of Utricularia species

References 

Carnivorous plants of South America
Epiphytes
Flora of Brazil
reniformis